The Centre Party was a registered political party in Jersey between 2005 and 2007.

Party ideology and policies
In the 2005 elections, the Centre Party's policies were:
Against the proposed 3% Goods and Services Tax (GST)
Against the continuation of the 20% income tax
Abolish the Vehicle Registration Duty for smaller cars
Would like to introduce a pay-as-you-earn (PAYE) system of income taxation
Would like to introduce a Manx-style immigration policy
Would like to introduced right-to-buy for State tenants.
Encourage fish-farming and organic farming
Encourage the use of renewable energy
Permit English barristers to appear in the Jersey courts, changing the rule that Jersey advocates had exclusive rights of audience
Separation of the spheres of executive and judicial areas.
Reduce the number of Civil Service Departments.

History
The Centre Party was one of two political parties formed in response to constitutional reforms due to be introduced in December 2005, when the States of Jersey Law 2005 implemented recommendations of the Clothier review by creating a system of ministerial government—with Council of Ministers headed by a Chief Minister in place of a committee-based system of administration.

Some of its founding members, including Senator Paul Le Claire, had initially belonged to Jersey Democratic Alliance – the other party created in 2005 – but left believing the JDA was too left wing. The Centre Party's first chairman was Larry Adams.

In 2006 the Centre Party renewed its commitment to instituting change in Jersey. At the 2006 Annual Meeting, Roger Benest was elected to serve as chairman with Larry Adams taking the role of Deputy Chairman. The party further indicated that it would support candidates in the 2008 Senatorial elections and renewed its commitment to implement its policies.

In 2007, the party announced that it would ballot its members on whether;
To become the Jersey Conservative Party
To become the Jersey Liberal Party
How closely it should seek to affiliate to a United Kingdom party
It was announced in July 2007 that the Centre Party would contest the next elections as the Jersey Conservative Party.

Election results
In the October 2005 elections two Centre Party candidates stood for the six vacant Senator seats. Neither was successful, with sitting Senator Paul Le Claire finishing 8th with 5,413 votes and losing his seat. The other Centre Party candidate, Kevin Lewis, polled 10th with 5,028 votes.

Six members of the Centre party stood in the November 2005 elections for deputies, though they did so as independents. Paul Le Claire and Kevin Lewis were elected as deputies, and reelected as independents in the 2008 elections.

References

Conservative parties in Jersey
Liberal conservative parties
Liberal parties in Jersey
Political parties established in 2005
2005 establishments in Jersey
Political parties disestablished in 2007
2007 disestablishments in Jersey
Defunct political parties in Jersey